Mullewa is a town in the Mid West region of Western Australia,  north of Perth and  east-northeast of Geraldton.  Mullewa is well known for an abundance of wildflowers in spring and it is one of the few places in Western Australia that the wreath flower grows. The surrounding areas produce wheat and other cereal crops. The town is a receival site for Cooperative Bulk Handling.

History 
European settlers moved to the area in 1869 to take up pastoral leases for farming. In 1894, the government built a narrow gauge railway from Geraldton to Mullewa and the town was gazetted in the same year. The town is named for Mullewa Spring, based on an Aboriginal name recorded by surveyor John Forrest in 1873. The meaning of the name is not certain, but the most accepted meaning is "place of fog".

Church of Our Lady of Mt. Carmel and the Holy Apostles St. Peter and St. Paul and Priesthouse
The architect priest Mgr John Hawes built the Church mainly with his own hands and the help of parishioners. Work started in 1921 and the stone and tile church was completed, after some interruptions, in 1927. The eclectic design of the Church shows some influence of Spanish Mission style. Hawes built a presbytery for himself next to the church and this, known as the Priesthouse, was finished in 1929: it's been used as a museum since 1980.

Rail service 
One of the Western Australian Government Railways named overnight passenger services from Perth was known as The Mullewa, which ceased operation in 1974.  Mullewa was the junction of the railway line northeast to Meekatharra, and south to Northam. The southward line is no longer operationally connected.

Iron ore from the Tallering Peak mine was hauled by road 65 km to Mullewa, and loaded onto railway wagons for haulage 107 km to Geraldton where ships of up to 60,000 DWT were loaded.

Media

Radio
Radio services available in Mullewa:                                 
ABC Midwest & Wheatbelt (6GN 828 AM) – Part of the ABC Local Radio Network.
ABC Radio National – (6ABCRN 99.7 FM) – Speciality talk and music.
Triple J – (6JJJ 98.9 FM) – Alternative music
ABC News Radio – (6PNN 101.3 FM) – Rolling News bulletins, news magazine programs and LIVE coverage from Federal Parliament House of Representatives.
WAFM (96.5FM) – Top 40 Music
The Spirit Network (Radio 6BAY FM 98.1/1512 AM) – Classic Hits / Adult Contemporary Music format aimed at 35 years + audience.
Radio Mama- 100.5FM- Indigenous Community station

Television
Free-to-air broadcast television services available in Mullewa:           
Australian Broadcasting Corporation (ABC) – ABC1, ABC2, ABC3, ABC News 24 (digital channels)
Special Broadcasting Service (SBS) – SBS One, SBS Two, SBS HD (digital channels)
WIN Television, a dual affiliate of both the Nine Network and Network Ten.
GWN7 (Golden West Network), an affiliate of the Seven Network.

The programming schedule is mainly the same as the Seven, Nine and Ten stations in Perth, with variations for news bulletins, sport telecasts such as the Australian Football League and National Rugby League, children's and lifestyle programs and advertorials. GWN7 produces a 30-minute regional news program each weeknight (originating from Bunbury) with a newsroom based in Geraldton, covering the local area.

Climate
Mullewa has a semi-arid climate with hot summers and mild to cool winters. The town features a dry summer/wetter winter routine, thus giving its climate some characteristics of the Mediterranean one.

References

External links 

 Map

 
Towns in Western Australia
Mid West (Western Australia)
Grain receival points of Western Australia